The field hockey competitions at the 2014 Central American and Caribbean Games took place at the High Performance Center in Veracruz, Mexico, from 15 to 24 November 2014. There were two competitions, one each for men and women. Seven national teams competed in the men's tournament and eight in the women's event. The top two teams in each tournament qualified to compete at the 2015 Pan American Games in Toronto, Canada.

Medal summary

Medalists

Medal table

Men's tournament

Cuba won their seventh gold medal by defeating Trinidad and Tobago 5–1 in the final. The hosts and defending champions Mexico won the bronze medal by defeating Barbados 5–4 in a shoot-out after a 1–1 draw in regular time.

Preliminary round

Pool A

Pool B

Fifth to seventh place classification

Seventh place

Fifth and sixth place

Medal round

Semi-finals

Bronze medal match

Gold medal match

Final standings

Awards

Women's tournament

Cuba won their fourth gold medal by defeating the Dominican Republic 4–3 in a shoot-out after a 3–3 draw in regular time. The hosts Mexico won the bronze medal by defeating the defending champions Trinidad and Tobago 2–1.

Preliminary round

Pool A

Pool B

Fifth to eighth place classification

5–8th place semi-finals

Seventh and eighth place

Fifth and sixth place

Medal round

Semi-finals

Bronze medal match

Gold medal match

Final standings

Awards

References

External links
Official PAHF website (men)
Official PAHF website (women)

2014 Central American and Caribbean Games events
Central American and Caribbean Games
2014
Qualification tournaments for the 2015 Pan American Games
2014 Central American and Caribbean Games